Mehdi Naghmi  (born 21 October 1988) is a Moroccan football striker who plays for MC Oujda.

Honours

Club
Ittihad Tanger
Botola: 2017–18

Individual
Botola top scorer : 2015–16.

References

1988 births
Living people
Moroccan footballers
Ittihad Tanger players
Association football forwards